The Battle of Kudal-Sangamam was fought in 1062 CE by the forces of the Chola king Rajendra Chola II and the Western Chalukya king Someshvara I at Kudal-Sangamam, where the Krishna and the Tungabhadra meet.

Causes 
To avenge the Battle of Koppam, the Western Chalukya king Someshvara I set out with a large force led by his army commander or dandanatha, Valadeva. The forces met with the Chola army led by Rajendra Chola II at Mudukkaru or Kudal-Sangamam at the junction of the rivers Krishna and Tungabhadra.

Events 

Rajendra Chola was supported by the heir apparent Rajamahendra and the king's brother, Virarajendra. Someshvara's sons Vikkalan and Singanan were defeated and forced to flee. The battle ended with a total victory for the Chola army.

A detailed description of the battle is given in the early inscriptions of Virarajendra's reign

Notes

Bibliography 
 
 

11th century in India
Kudal-Sangamam
Kudal-Sangamam
Western Chalukya Empire
1062 in Asia